Lisa Raymond and Samantha Stosur were the defending champions at the 2007 Sony Ericsson Open. They successfully defended their title by beating Cara Black and Liezel Huber 6-4, 3-6, [10-2] in the final.

Seeds

  Lisa Raymond Samantha Stosur (champions)
  Cara Black Liezel Huber (final)
  Yan Zi Zheng Jie (quarterfinals)
  Květa Peschke Rennae Stubbs (second round)
  Katarina Srebotnik Ai Sugiyama (first round)
  Virginia Ruano Pascual Paola Suárez (first round)
  Nathalie Dechy Vera Zvonareva (first round)
  Chan Yung-jan Chuang Chia-jung (semifinals)

Draw

Final

Earlier rounds

Top half

Bottom half

External links
PDF Draw
Women's Doubles Draw

2007 Sony Ericsson Open
Sony Ericsson Open